Medini Mohan Choudhury (31 March 1928  13 February 2003), known by his pen name as Medini Choudhury, was a Bodo novelist, short story writer, columnist, critic and a retired civil services officer. He wrote thirty books in Assamese language and two books in English, including Ananya Prantor, a novel which is recognized one of the prominent writings in Assamese literature.

He also worked at literary magazines and newspapers such as Asomiya, a weekly newspaper, Dainik Santidoot and Samakaal. He worked as an editor for Sutradhar magazine, and primarily used to wrote stort stories, columns and essays for newspapers and magazines.

Biography 
He was born on 31 March 1928 in Goreswar town of Kamrup district, Assam in a Bodo family. He graduated in 1949 from the Cotton College (now Cotton University). He had three daughters and four sons. Prior to joining civil services, he worked as a journalist. Later in 1956, he left journalism and started working as a government officer due to personal financial crisis. He also wrote a book titled Luit, Barak aru Islam that covers contribution of the Muslims to the Assam Movement.

Publications

Awards and accordion

Death 
Choudhury was suffering from medical complications, and was admitted to a hospital for medical treatment. He was later admitted to a medical collage in Chennai where he died of myocardial infarction on 13 February 2003. He was cremated at Nabagraha crematorium in Assam.

References 

1928 births
2003 deaths
Novelists from Assam
Journalists from Assam
Recipients of the Sahitya Akademi Award in Assamese
Cotton College, Guwahati alumni
Indian Administrative Service officers